Mirabelli SA is a Puerto Rican association football club from Carolina that currently plays in the Liga Puerto Rico.

History
Mirabelli SA joined the nascent Liga Puerto Rico for its inaugural season in 2019/20. It went on to finish in seventh place of eight teams. The club began the 2019/20 campaign which was eventually abandoned because of the COVID-19 pandemic.

Domestic history
Key

References

External links
Official Facebook profile
Liga Puerto Rico profile
Soccerway profile

Football clubs in Puerto Rico
Association football clubs established in 2010